Martin George Bayley (born 10 July 1952) is an English former cricketer. Bayley was a right-handed batsman who bowled slow left-arm orthodox. He was born in Leamington Spa, Warwickshire.

Bayley made two first-class appearances for Warwickshire in 1969 against Cambridge University and Scotland.  Against Cambridge University, Bayley took the wicket of Roger Knight in Cambridge University's first-innings, finishing with figures of 1/26 from 5 overs.  He didn't bowl in the university's second-innings and wasn't called upon to bat in the match, which ended in a narrow 17 run victory for Warwickshire.  Against Scotland, Bayley bowled 20 wicketless overs in Scotland's first-innings, while in Warwickshire's first-innings he ended not out on 1.  In Scotland's second-innings, he took the wickets of David Stewart and James Brown to finish with figures of 2/54 from 28 overs.  He was dismissed for a single run in Warwickshire's second-innings by Jimmy Allan, with Scotland winning the match by 4 wickets.  These were his only major appearances for Warwickshire.

References

External links
Martin Bayley at ESPNcricinfo
Martin Bayley at CricketArchive

1952 births
Living people
Sportspeople from Leamington Spa
English cricketers
Warwickshire cricketers